August Meuleman (20 October 1906 – 12 February 2000) was a Belgian cyclist. He competed in the team pursuit event at the 1928 Summer Olympics.

References

External links
 

1906 births
2000 deaths
Belgian male cyclists
Olympic cyclists of Belgium
Cyclists at the 1928 Summer Olympics
Sportspeople from Ghent
Cyclists from East Flanders
20th-century Belgian people